Besra Duman (born 10 January 2001) is a Turkish Paralympic powerlifter. She won the bronze medal in the women's 55 kg at the 2020 Summer Paralympics held in Tokyo, Japan.  A few months later, she won the silver medal in her event at the 2021 World Para Powerlifting Championships held in Tbilisi, Georgia.

References

External links
 

Living people
2001 births
Powerlifters at the 2020 Summer Paralympics
Paralympic bronze medalists for Turkey
Paralympic medalists in powerlifting
Paralympic powerlifters of Turkey
Sportspeople from Van, Turkey
Turkish disabled sportspeople
21st-century Turkish sportswomen